James Edward Carpenter Jr. (born March 22, 1989) is an American football guard who is a free agent. He was drafted by the Seattle Seahawks as the 25th overall pick in the 2011 NFL Draft. He played college football at Alabama.

High school career
Carpenter attended Hephzibah High School in Hephzibah, Georgia, where he played offensive guard for the Hephzibah Rebels high school football team.

Considered a two-star recruit by Scout.com, Carpenter was listed as the No. 193 offensive guard in the nation in 2007.

Carpenter received only one offer, which was by Iowa State. He committed to the Cyclones on February 6, 2007, but he struggled academically and was placed at Coffeyville Community College by Iowa State.

College career

Coffeyville Community College
In two seasons at Coffeyville Community College, Carpenter started every game at left tackle for the Red Ravens and earned All-Conference (KJCCC) honors twice. In 2008, he was named to the NJCAA All-American first-team.

Rated as a four-star recruit by Rivals.com, Carpenter was ranked as the No. 32 junior college prospect in 2009.

Alabama
Although he remained an Iowa State signee, he began visiting other schools "just […] to make sure I make a good decision". He made official visits to Texas Tech, Oklahoma, and Ole Miss, before eventually committing to Alabama and head coach Nick Saban.

Carpenter faced the difficult task to replace All-American left tackle Andre Smith. While analysts did not expect him to dominate as a run blocker like Smith, they saw him as "a rock in pass protection".

Carpenter went on to start every game at left tackle for the Crimson Tide in 2009 and 2010. In the 2009 season, Carpenter was part of the undefeated Crimson Tide team that won the National Championship over the Texas Longhorns.

Professional career

Seattle Seahawks
Carpenter had a good post-season performance and, according to Sports Illustrated, went "from a third-round choice to a player who could be a surprise pick late in round one". He was selected with the 25th overall pick in the 2011 NFL Draft by the Seattle Seahawks. He was the fourth tackle to be selected that year. Carpenter started nine games in his rookie season before suffering a season ending ACL injury and being placed on the injured reserve.

Carpenter was limited to seven games in 2012 still recovering from an ACL injury from the previous year.

In the 2013 season, Carpenter appeared in 16 games with 10 starts. Carpenter earned a Super Bowl ring with the Seahawks in Super Bowl XLVIII where they defeated the Denver Broncos 43–8, giving Carpenter his first career championship title and the Seahawks their first Super Bowl win in franchise history.

In the offseason, Seattle declined the fifth-year option for Carpenter. In the 2014 season, Carpenter started all 13 games he appeared in and participated in the Seahawks making it to Super Bowl XLIX, where they lost to the New England Patriots by a score of 28–24.

New York Jets
On March 10, 2015, Carpenter signed a four-year contract with the New York Jets worth $19.1 million. He started in all 16 games for the Jets in the 2015 season.

At the start of the 2016 league year, Carpenter agreed to restructure his contract converting $3.96 million into bonuses creating $2.46 million in cap space. He started in all 16 games for the Jets in the 2016 season. In addition, he had a fumble recovery.

In the 2017 season, Carpenter started in all 16 games and had two fumble recoveries on the season.

In 2018, Carpenter started 10 games at left guard while dealing with a shoulder injury in Week 7. He aggravated the injury prior to Week 12 and was ultimately placed on injured reserve on November 28, 2018.

Atlanta Falcons
On March 13, 2019, Carpenter signed a four-year, $21 million contract with the Atlanta Falcons. He was named the Falcons starting left guard to begin the season. He started 11 games there before being placed on injured reserve on December 20, 2019, with a concussion.

The Falcons released Carpenter on March 9, 2021.

Baltimore Ravens
On October 19, 2021, Carpenter was signed to the Baltimore Ravens practice squad. He was released on November 20, 2021.

New Orleans Saints
On December 8, 2021, Carpenter was signed to the New Orleans Saints practice squad. He was promoted to the active roster on December 18.

NFL career statistics

References

External links

 
 Atlanta Falcons bio
 New York Jets bio

1989 births
Living people
Alabama Crimson Tide football players
American football offensive guards
American football offensive tackles
Atlanta Falcons players
Baltimore Ravens players
Coffeyville Red Ravens football players
New Orleans Saints players
New York Jets players
Players of American football from Augusta, Georgia
Seattle Seahawks players
Ed Block Courage Award recipients